Blue Grass of Kentucky is a 1950 American sports drama film directed by William Beaudine and starring Bill Williams, Jane Nigh, and Ralph Morgan.

Plot
Major Randolph McIvor has one son, Lin, helping train his horses and another, Sandy, riding them. Their stable has fallen on hard times, but they are preparing their promising new thoroughbreds Encino and Tarzana for the Kentucky Derby.

Lin is in love with Armistead's daughter, Pat, although her wealth intimidates him. Armistead has a star horse called Blue Grass that also will be a Derby contender. What no one but Pat knows is that Blue Grass's sire was a different horse than the one originally intended. A trainer, Layton, files a formal complaint after Blue Grass wins the Derby, claiming that the winner's pedigree can not be proven. But in the end he is fired and Pat agrees to marry Lin.

Cast
 Bill Williams as Lin McIvor  
 Jane Nigh as Pat Armistead  
 Ralph Morgan as Maj. Randolph McIvor  
 Russell Hicks as James B. Armistead  
 Robert 'Buzz' Henry as Sandy McIvor  
 Ted Hecht as Layton 
 Dick Foote as Jim Brown 
 Jack Howard as Armistead Jockey  
 Bill Terrell as Pompey  
 Stephen S. Harrison as Attendant  
 Pierre Watkin as Head Steward 
 Harry Lauter as Dick Wentworth

References

Bibliography
 Marshall, Wendy L. William Beaudine: From Silents to Television. Scarecrow Press, 2005.

External links
 

1950 films
1950s sports drama films
1950s English-language films
American sports drama films
Films directed by William Beaudine
American horse racing films
Monogram Pictures films
1950 drama films
1950s American films